Pseudoscolopia is a genus of plants in the family Salicaceae, which contains a single species, Pseudoscolopia polyantha. It is endemic to South Africa. It is threatened by habitat loss.

References

 
Salicaceae genera
Monotypic Malpighiales genera
Taxonomy articles created by Polbot